Joppa (from , meaning "workshop") is a farmstead settlement in Cornwall, England, United Kingdom. It is situated approximately one mile (1.6 km) southeast of Hayle and is in Hayle civil parish.

References

Hamlets in Cornwall
Hayle